The Blind Goddess is a 1947 play by the British barrister and writer Patrick Hastings.

It premiered at the Theatre Royal, Brighton before beginning a 133 performance West End run at the Apollo Theatre. The cast included Basil Radford, Honor Blackman, Joan Haythorne and William Mervyn.

Film adaptation
In 1948 it was made into a film The Blind Goddess by Gainsborough Pictures. Directed by Harold French it stars Eric Portman, Anne Crawford and Hugh Williams.

References

Bibliography
 Goble, Alan. The Complete Index to Literary Sources in Film. Walter de Gruyter, 1999.
 Wearing, J.P. The London Stage 1940-1949: A Calendar of Productions, Performers, and Personnel.  Rowman & Littlefield, 2014.

1947 plays
Plays by Patrick Hastings
British plays adapted into films
Plays set in London
West End plays